Flanshaw is a suburb of Wakefield in West Yorkshire, England. It is located to the west of the city centre and is administrated by the City of Wakefield. Part of the area is a council housing estate. The local primary schools are Flanshaw Junior and Infant School and Flanshaw St. Michaels Junior and Infant School

References

Suburbs of Wakefield